The Divine Word Mission Seminary (also known as Christ the King Mission Seminary) is a Roman Catholic seminary in Quezon City, Philippines, run by the Divine Word Missionaries. This place is more popularly known as the Society of the Divine Word(SVD). The seminary offers a seminary track of junior and senior high school, an undergraduate course of A.B. Philosophy and a graduate program on M.A. Philosophy. I

History

In 1929 the SVD General Council under the Superior General, Fr. William Gier, SVD, approved the establishment of a new mission seminary for SVDs in the Philippines. Fr. Theodore Buttenbruch, SVD, as Regional Superior, was given the task to construct a seminary, in a twenty-hectare property in the newly opened area in Quezon City. Bishop William Finnemann, SVD, who was then the auxiliary Bishop of Manila, who later became the first bishop in Mindoro, supported the purchase of the property for the establishment of the seminary.

On August 4, 1933, the ground-breaking for the foundation of the mission seminary began. They would specifically be focusing on training Filipinos, which was unusual for the time. In the past, Filipinos were consigned to secular clergy status, and only selectively admitted to the religious orders. Bishop Guerrero said of the new foundation: "It is the first institution of its kind for our Filipino youth and its need has been long felt". 

In 1934, the Christ the King Mission Seminary was inaugurated and formally opened to accept candidates for priesthood.

The High School department of the seminary was opened after the second World War in 1946. At that time, the seminary was the formation center that included the two-year college course before entry to the novitiate, a two-year program of spiritual formation. In the second year, studies in Philosophy were included, followed by another year to complete the philosophy studies. Seminarians had the option to study further for a masteral degree, or go to regency or continue to the four-year Theology course leading to ordination.

The first building, now called the Buttenbruch building, accommodated all the seminarians, faculty and staff. The inflow of vocations coming from the various mission fields especially in Abra and Mindoro necessitated construction of other structures. Facilities such as a swimming pool, stage, basketball and tennis courts, the Arnoldus Hall, the Faculty Building, the Novitiate and Scholasticate buildings followed in rapid order. With the growth of vocations, the need for economic support mechanisms were put in place. Thus, the carpentry, vocational and mechanic shops, piggery and poultry facilities, all run by the Brothers, were set up one after the other. The portion fronting the street and the church was used as an outlet for sale of religious materials, and as a venue for small group meetings.

In 1963, due to the sustained growth of vocations, the Novitiate and Scholasticate (Philosophy and Theology students) were successively transferred to the city of Tagaytay, a place more conducive to prayer and study. 

In 1988, Christ the King Seminary High School was closed. This left the seminary as a center for the philosophy studies for the four-year course preparatory to postulancy and novitiate. Feeder seminaries in the north were located in Urdaneta, Pangasinan. Davao City in the south offered a two-year philosophy course. These seminarians added students for the last two years of the philosophy course at Christ the King Seminary. 

In 2016, the Divine Word Formation Center Urdaneta Pangasinan and Davao was temporarily closed due to the development of the New Education System in the Philippines, particularly the opening of Senior High Curriculum as an added requirement for students. Because of this development, all aspiring SVD Candidates are now moved to Christ the King Seminary as the central seminary of the SVD Philippines for Philosophy Formation. 

Today, Christ the King Seminary is called as Divine Word Mission Seminary.

Architecture 
It is a unique structure in the Philippine setting because it is patterned after a medieval castle.

References

External links

 Societas Verbi Divini
 The Divine Word Seminary - video presentation created by the fourth year Scholastics 2006; music by Fr. Raul Caga, SVD
 SVD to air ‘Seven Last Words’ on ABS-CBN on Good Friday  April 4th, 2012
 Website
 DWMS Website 
 Diocesan Shrine of Jesus the Divine Word
 DVD Shrine
 Shrine was declared a Pilgrimage Shrine on November 1, 2012 by the Bishop of Cubao

Catholic seminaries in the Philippines
Christian organizations established in 1933
Educational institutions established in 1933
Catholic organizations established in the 20th century
Divine Word Missionaries Order
1933 establishments in the Philippines
Education in Quezon City